() is a style of beer originating in Cologne (Köln), Germany. It has an original gravity between 11 and 14 degrees Plato (specific gravity of 1.044 to 1.056). In appearance, it is bright and clear with a straw-yellow hue. 

Since 1997, the term "Kölsch" has had a protected geographical indication (PGI) within the European Union, indicating a beer that is made within 50km (31mi) of the city of Cologne and brewed according to the Kölsch Konvention as defined by the members of the Cologne Brewery Association (Kölner Brauerei-Verband).

Kölsch is warm fermented with top-fermenting yeast, then conditioned at cold temperatures like a lager. This brewing process is similar to that used for Düsseldorf's .

History

Bottom-fermented beer started to appear in the Cologne region in the early 17th century and its popularity threatened the business interest of the brewers of Cologne, who only produced top-fermented beers. In response, the town council of Cologne in 1603 forced young brewers to swear an oath "that you prepare your beer, as of old, from good malt, good cereals, and good hops, well-boiled, and that you pitch it with top-yeast, and by no means with bottom yeast." In 1676 and again in 1698, the council again tried to legislate against bottom-fermented beer by forbidding its sale within the city walls. However, by 1750, Cologne brewers were competing against bottom-fermented beers by using a hybridized brewing process, first brewing their beer using top-fermenting yeast but then aging the beer in cold cellars like bottom-fermented beer.

This type of beer was first called  in 1918 to describe the beer that had been brewed by the Sünner brewery since 1906, developed from the similar but cloudier variant  (for "white" in the Kölsch dialect). By the start of World War II Cologne had more than forty breweries; only two were left by the end of the war.

In 1946, many of the breweries managed to re-establish themselves. In the 1940s and 1950s,  still could not match the sales of bottom-fermented beer, but in the 1960s the style began to rise in popularity in the Cologne beer market.

In 1986, 24 brewers of Cologne and vicinity agreed upon the Kölsch Konvention, which set out the brewing process that had to be used, and restricted the use of Kölsch to breweries in Cologne, and outside the city, which had already acquired a valuable asset in the designation Kölsch before the Convention came into force. 

Only two breweries later produce beer according to the Kölsch Konvention, Hellers from Cologne (opened 1991) and the Bischoff-Brauerei from Brühl (opened 1961, reopened 2001). Most of the brand on the list are still available, because another brewery took over the brand. 

Many breweries closed in the years that followed. Only six of the breweries listed are still active, Früh, Gaffel, Reissdorff (the big three), Erzquell, Päffgen and Malzmühle - after Malzmühle announced it will take over Sester in 2022. 

In 1997,  became a product with protected geographical indication (PGI), expanding this protection to the entire EU. 

Exported  does not need to strictly comply with the Provisional German Beer Law, the current implementation of the Reinheitsgebot.

Serving
 

Instead of waiting for the drinker to order a refill, the Köbes immediately replaces an empty Stange with a full one, marking a tick on the coaster under the Stange. If the drinker does not want another refill, they place the coaster on top of the empty Stange and pay for the number of beers marked on the coaster.

Outside the EU
As noted above,  is a product which has a protected geographical indication (PGI) in the EU. This protection is not recognized outside the jurisdiction of the EU, and many breweries outside the EU produce and market beer as "kolsch" or "kölsch" with varying degrees of authenticity.

See also
 (Kölsches Knupp, Kölnisches Knupp, Kuletschbier), another type of beer of Colognian origin
Cream ale
Beer in Germany

References

External links

Kölsch-Konvention 
Website of the Deutscher Brauer-Bund e. V. 
Brauhaustouren in Köln 
Frankfurter Allgemeine Article on the Work of a Köbes 
 

Economy of Cologne
Culture in Cologne
German beer styles
German products with protected designation of origin